Bert Wright is an American ice dancer. With partner Sharon McKenzie, he is the 1957 U.S. national champion. They won the bronze medal at the 1957 World Figure Skating Championships.

Results
(with Sharon McKenzie)

References

American male ice dancers
Year of birth missing (living people)
Living people
World Figure Skating Championships medalists